Keyboard controller may refer to:
 Keyboard controller (computing), a computer hardware which connects a keyboard to the main board
 In music, a MIDI keyboard with some additional controls